Gardamas is a small town in Klaipėda County, in northwestern Lithuania. According to the 2011 census, the town has a population of 398 people.

History

In 1304  Gardamas was destroyed by the Teutonic Order. In 1561. Gardamas was mentioned a village, by the parish in  Valaki .  Gardamas  appeared in   1679 on the  Prussia map. In 1706, Kvėdarna Paco Gardamo built the first church in Gardamas .

References

Towns in Lithuania
Towns in Klaipėda County